Kandarpur railway station is a railway station on the East Coast Railway network in the state of Odisha, India. It serves Kandarpur village. Its code is KDRP. It has two platforms. Passenger, MEMU, Express trains halt at Kandarpur railway station.

Major trains

 Paradeep−Puri Intercity Express

See also
 Cuttack district

References

Railway stations in Cuttack district
Khurda Road railway division